The 2023 CONCACAF Champions League (officially the 2023 Scotiabank CONCACAF Champions League for sponsorship reasons) is the 15th edition of the CONCACAF Champions League under its current name, and overall the 58th edition of the premier football club competition organized by CONCACAF, the regional governing body of North America, Central America, and the Caribbean. The winner of the final will earn the right to play in the 2023 FIFA Club World Cup in Saudi Arabia as well as the 2025 FIFA Club World Cup alongside the winners from 2021 to 2024.

Seattle Sounders FC was the title holder, but they did not qualify for this tournament and will be unable to defend their title.

Teams
The following 16 teams (from eight associations) qualify for the tournament.
North American Zone: 9 teams (from three associations)
Central American Zone: 6 teams (from four associations), all of them qualified through the 2022 CONCACAF League
Caribbean Zone: 1 team (from one association), qualified through the 2022 Caribbean Club Championship

In the following table, the number of appearances, last appearance, and previous best result count only those in the CONCACAF Champions League era starting from 2008–09 (not counting those in the era of the Champions' Cup from 1962 to 2008).

Draw

The draw took take place in Miami, Florida, on 7 November 2022. The seeding of teams was based on the CONCACAF Club Index. The CONCACAF Club Index, instead of ranking each team, was based on the on-field performance of the teams that occupied the respective qualifying slots in the previous five editions of the CONCACAF Champions League. To determine the total points awarded to a slot in any single edition of the CONCACAF Champions League, CONCACAF used the following formula:

The slots were assigned by the following rules:
For teams from North America, nine teams qualified based on criteria set by their association (e.g., tournament champions, runners-up, cup champions), resulting in an assigned slot (e.g., MEX1, MEX2) for each team. If a team from Canada qualified through the CONCACAF League, they were ranked within their association, resulting in an assigned slot (i.e., CAN2) for them.
For teams from Central America, they qualified through the CONCACAF League, and were ranked per association by their CONCACAF League ranking, resulting in an assigned slot (e.g., CRC1, CRC2) for each team.
For teams from the Caribbean, the CONCACAF Caribbean Club Championship champions were assigned the Caribbean champion slot (i.e., CCC1). If teams from the Caribbean qualified through the CONCACAF League, they were ranked per association by their CONCACAF League ranking, resulting in an assigned slot (e.g., JAM1, SUR1) for each team.

The 16 teams were distributed in the pots as follows:

Format
Each tie, including the final, is played over two legs, with each team playing on a home-and-away basis.
In the round of 16, quarter-finals, and semi-finals, the away goals rule is applied if the aggregate score is tied after the second leg. If still tied, a penalty shoot-out is used to determine the winner (Regulations Article 12.7).
In the final, extra time is played if the match is tied after regulation time. If the score is still tied after extra time, a penalty shoot-out is used to determine the winner (Regulations Article 12.8).

Schedule

Bracket

Round of 16
In the round of 16, the matchups were decided by draw: R16-1 through R16-8. The teams from Pot 1 in the draw will host the second leg.

Summary
The first legs were played on 7–9 March, and the second legs will be played on 14–16 March 2023.

|}
Notes

Matches

Violette won 3–2 on aggregate.

León won 3–0 on aggregate.

1–1 on aggregate. UANL won on away goals.

1–1 on aggregate. Motagua won on away goals.

Vancouver Whitecaps FC won 7–3 on aggregate.

Los Angeles FC won 4–2 on aggregate.

Atlas won 5–4 on aggregate.

Philadelphia Union won 4–0 on aggregate.

Quarter-finals
In the quarter-finals, the matchups were determined as follows:
QF1: Winner R16-1 vs. Winner R16-2
QF2: Winner R16-3 vs. Winner R16-4
QF3: Winner R16-5 vs. Winner R16-6
QF4: Winner R16-7 vs. Winner R16-8
The winners of round of 16 matchups 1, 3, 5 and 7 hosted the second leg.

Summary

|}

Matches

Semi-finals
In the semi-finals, the matchups were determined as follows:
SF1: Winner QF1 vs. Winner QF2
SF2: Winner QF3 vs. Winner QF4

The semi-finalists in each tie which has the better performance across all previous rounds hosts the second leg.

Final

In the final (Winner SF1 vs. Winner SF2), the finalist which has the better performances in previous rounds hosts the second leg.

Top goalscorers

See also
2022 CONCACAF League

Notes

References

External links

 
2023
1
Current association football seasons
March 2023 sports events in North America
April 2023 sports events in North America
May 2023 sports events in North America
June 2023 sports events in North America